Penn-Harris-Madison School Corporation, commonly known as simply PHM, is a school district located in north-central Indiana, a region locally known as Michiana.  The PHM district is located in and named for the three easternmost townships of St. Joseph County: Penn, Harris, and Madison.

The district includes all of Osceola and portions of Granger, Mishawaka, and South Bend.  It also includes Wyatt addresses.

Schools

Elementary schools
 Bittersweet Elementary School 
 Elm Road Elementary School 
 Elsie Rogers Elementary School 
 Horizon Elementary School 
 Madison Elementary School 
 Mary Frank Elementary School 
 Meadow's Edge Elementary School 
 Moran Elementary School 
 Northpoint Elementary School 
 Prairie Vista Elementary School
 Walt Disney Elementary School

Middle schools
 Discovery Middle School (Granger)
 Grissom Middle School (unincorporated area)
 Schmucker Middle School (unincorporated area)

High school
 Penn High School (unincorporated area)

References

External links
 Penn-Harris-Madison School Corporation
 Indiana Department of Education Corporation Snapshot

School districts in Indiana
Education in St. Joseph County, Indiana